John Thomas (1813–1862) was a British sculptor and architect, who worked on Buckingham Palace and the Palace of Westminster.

Life
John Thomas was born in Chalford, Gloucestershire. Apprenticed to a stonemason after being left an orphan, he later went to Birmingham where his elder brother William was an architect (and who later moved to Canada to continue his career). He was noticed by Charles Barry who immediately employed John Thomas as a stone and wood carver on Birmingham Grammar School (now demolished), his first collaboration with Augustus Welby Northmore Pugin. Barry later appointed him the Superintendent of Stone Carving at the Palace of Westminster in London, in which role he was responsible for supplying sixty statues of English kings and queens, including those in the niches of the Central Lobby of the Palace.

Works

Thomas's work 'Charity' was shown at the Great Exhibition of 1851, and then adapted to form a memorial in Christ Church, Chalford, to his brother Richard who died in 1852. His final work was the colossal statue of William Shakespeare displayed at the 1862 International Exhibition. A dispute over its placement hastened his death in April 1862, and he was buried in Kensal Green Cemetery, London.

Other works
 Twelve large dragons ornamenting ceilings of two grand saloons at Brighton Pavilion, made for the grand re-opening, 1851.
 A replica of the Bristol High Cross, which was erected in 1851.
 Eight allegorical statues at the 1847 Euston railway station representing the cities served by the line: London, Liverpool, Manchester, etc.
 Statue of Hugh Myddelton at Islington Green, London.
 Statue of Godiva, held in Maidstone Museum & Art Gallery
 The Atlas Fountain at Castle Howard
 Four British lions at each corner of the Britannia Bridge crossing the Menai Strait between the island of Anglesey and the mainland of Wales
 extensive friezes and spandrel figures for the Lloyds Bank, Bristol
 Carving and statues on Halifax Town Hall, created c. 1860 – 1862 in collaboration with Edward Middleton Barry to design of Charles Barry. Thomas carved three statues for the tower, but died before completing the fourth, which was overseen by another artist to his design.
 Life-sized plaster maquette (at Canterbury Heritage Museum as of 2013) and bronze (permanently at House of Lords) of Stephen Langton. One of 17 maquettes for 17 bronzes depicting those present at the signing of the Magna Carta.
 Boadicea 1855 Y Gaer
 Joseph Sturge memorial, Birmingham (Erected after Thomas' death)
 Tympanum above main door of Leeds Town Hall

Works as an architect
 Headington Hill Hall
 Somerleyton Hall
 Brandon railway station (1845)

Picture gallery

References

Sources
 John Thomas (1813-1862)
 John Thomas (1813-1862), sculptor, a biography
 John Thomas (1813-1862)
 Charles Barry, Jun. (1824-1900) - by Christie's

External links

"John Thomas and his ‘wonderful facility of invention’: Revisiting a neglected sculptor", V&A Online Journal, Issue No. 3 Spring 2011, ISSN 2043-667X, by Ian Blatchford
 Lady Godiva (Thomas) article about the stutue, on Italian Wikipedia

1813 births
1862 deaths
19th-century British sculptors
19th-century English male artists
British architectural sculptors
Burials at Kensal Green Cemetery
English male sculptors
People from Chalford